Killers Behind Bars: The Untold Story is a British television documentary series. It was presented by David Wilson and was broadcast on Channel 5 in 2012 and 2013.

Series 1 Episode 1: The Suffolk Strangler 
Air date: 12 June 2012

Steve Wright committed five murders in 2006. Wilson speculates that Wright murdered 22-year-old prostitute Michelle Bettles in Norfolk in March 2002.

Series 1 Episode 2: Peter Tobin 
Air date: 19 June 2012

Peter Tobin was convicted of the murders of Vicky Hamilton, Dinah McNicol and Angelika Kluk. He killed Vicky in Margate, Dinah in Hampshire and Angelika in a church in Glasgow. Wilson speculates that Tobin is responsible for the murder of 22-year-old student Jessie Earl in May 1980.

Series 1 Episode 3: Robert Black 
Air date: 26 June 2012

Robert Black killed three young girls and attempted to kill another. Wilson speculates that Black is responsible for the unsolved killings of 13-year-old Genette Tate in Devon and 13-year-old April Fabb in Norfolk.

Series 2 Episode 1: Levi Bellfield 
Air date: 14 March 2013

Levi Bellfield was found guilty of killing 13-year-old Milly Dowler in 2002, having already been convicted of the murders of Amelie Delagrange and Marsha McDonnell and attempted murder of Kate Sheedy.

Series 2 Episode 2: Stephen Griffiths: The Crossbow Cannibal 
Air date: 21 March 2013

Stephen Griffiths the self-dubbed Crossbow Cannibal, who killed and dismembered three women between 2009 and 2010 - and ate parts of their bodies. Wilson asks when Griffiths' killing cycle began and whether he is responsible for more deaths than those already known about.

Series 2 Episode 3: Robert Napper 
Air date: 28 March 2013

Professor David Wilson investigates the crimes of multiple killer and serial rapist Robert Napper and looks at other unsolved attacks that he may have been responsible for.

Series 2 Episode 4: Anthony Hardy: The Camden Ripper 
Air date: 4 April 2013

Professor David Wilson investigates the crimes of Anthony Hardy dubbed The Camden Ripper. He explores possible connections between the killer and a number of unsolved murders and looks into the story of Sally White, whose corpse was found in Hardy's bed, but whose death was attributed to natural causes by the pathologist.

References

External links 
Channel 5

2012 British television series debuts
2012 British television series endings
2010s British crime television series
2010s British documentary television series
British crime television series
British television documentaries
Channel 5 (British TV channel) original programming
English-language television shows